Bad Mothers is an Australian television drama series that premiered on the Nine Network on 18 February 2019. The show centres around five women whose lives collide following a series of shocking events and learn that life can get a whole lot more complicated outrageous and fun, than they ever imagined.

Synopsis

Sarah's suburban bliss is destroyed when her husband has an affair with her best friend, Charlotte, head of the Bedford Mothers’ Club. Ousted from the snooty club, Sarah finds unexpected support among the titular Bad Mothers. The new friends exact revenge on Charlotte that leads to deadly results.

Cast
 Melissa George as Charlotte
 Tess Haubrich as Sarah 
 Daniel MacPherson as Anton
 Don Hany as Kyle
 Steve Bastoni as Tom
 Mandy McElhinney as Maddie
 Shalom Brune-Franklin as Bindy
 Jessica Tovey as Danielle
 Kate Lister as Phoebe

Episodes

Ratings

Adaptation

In September 2020, Jungle Entertainment announced they are in active development on creating an adaptation of the series for U.S. audiences.

References

External links
 

Nine Network original programming
Australian drama television series
2019 Australian television series debuts
2019 Australian television series endings